This is a list of the counts of Urgell, a county of the Principality of Catalonia in the 10th through 13th centuries.

c. 798–870 Counts appointed by the Carolingians

798–820 Borrell, count of Urgell and Cerdanya
820–824 Aznar Galíndez I, count of Aragon, was given Borrell's counties while he was exiled from Aragon
824–834 Galindo Aznárez I
834–848 Sunifred I
848–870 Solomon (or Miró)

870–992 Counts from the House of Barcelona

870–897 Wilfred the Hairy, Count of Barcelona, Girona-Osona and Urgell-Cerdanya
898–948 Sunifred II 
948–966 Miró de Barcelona, born c. 940 
966–30 September 992 Borrell II, count of Barcelona, Girona, Osona

992–1213 Counts from the House of Barcelona-Urgell

992 – 1 September 1010 Ermengol I el de Còrdova ("of Cordoba"), born 975, killed in battle at Córdoba in 1010
1010–1038 Ermengol II el Peregrí ("the Pilgrim"), born 1009, died on pilgrimage to Jerusalem, 1038
1038–1065 Ermengol III el de Barbastre ("of Barbastro"), born c. 1033, killed at Barbastro in February or March 1065
1065–11 March 1092 Ermengol IV el de Gerp ("of Gerp"), born c. 1056 
1092–1102 Ermengol V el de Mollerussa ("of Mollerussa"), born 1078/1079, died in the Battle of Mollerussa
1102–1153/1154 Ermengol VI el de Castella ("of Castile"), born 1096
1153/1154–1184 Ermengol VII el de València ("of Valencia") 
1184–1208/1209 Ermengol VIII el de Sant Hilari ("of Sant Hilari") 
1208/1209–1213 Countess Aurembiaix (first time) under regency of Peter II of Aragon

1213–1228 Counts from the House of Cabrera

1213–1228 Guerau I of Urgell, IV of Cabrera (usurper)

1228–1236 Counts from the House of Barcelona-Urgell

1228–1231 Countess Aurembiaix (second time), 
from 1229 with her husband, Peter I. She died in 1231.
1231–1236 King James I of Aragon

1236–1314 Counts from the House of Cabrera

1236–1243 Ponç I (Ponç IV of Cabrera)
1243 Ermengol IX
1243–1268 Álvaro el Castellà ("the Castilian")
1268–1314 Ermengol X

1314–1413 Counts from the House of Aragon

10 November 1314 – 1327 King Alfonso IV of Aragon, died 1366
1327–1347 James I of Urgell, Prince of Aragon, born 1321, poisoned in Barcelona in 1347
1347–1408 Peter II of Urgell, born 1340, died at Balaguer, 1408
1408–31 October 1413 James II of Urgell. When Martin I of Aragon died, James was a candidate to the crown, but the Compromise of Caspe preferred Ferdinand of Antequera. James revolted, and on 31 October 1413, surrendered to the king. The county of Urgell was dissolved and count James died in jail in the castle of Xàtiva on 1 June 1433.

See also
County of Urgell
House of Cabrera

 
History of Catalonia
Medieval Spain
Catalan nobility
Urgell